Pohoarna is a village in Șoldănești District, Moldova.

References

Villages of Șoldănești District